Hau Tak Estate is a public housing estate in Hang Hau, Tseung Kwan O, New Territories, Hong Kong, near East Point City. It is the fourth public housing estate in Tseung Kwan O and consists of six blocks of Harmony I style, providing more than 4,000 rental flats built between 1993 and 1994.

Chung Ming Court and Yu Ming Court are Home Ownership Scheme housing courts in Tseung Kwan O near Hau Tak Estate, built in 1993 and 1994 respectively.

Houses

Hau Tak Estate

Chung Ming Court

Yu Ming Court

Demographics
According to the 2016 by-census, Hau Tak Estate had a population of 12,806, Chung Ming Court had a population of 4,894 while Yu Ming Court had a population of 3,555. Altogether the population amounts to 21,255.

Politics
For the 2019 District Council election, the estate fell within two constituencies. Hau Tak Estate and Chung Ming Court fall within the Hau Tak constituency, which is currently represented by Wong Cheuk-nga, while Yu Ming Court falls within the Fu Nam constituency, which is currently represented by Andrew Chan Yiu-chor.

See also

Public housing estates in Tseung Kwan O

References

Public housing estates in Hong Kong
Residential buildings completed in 1993
Residential buildings completed in 1994
Hang Hau
Tseung Kwan O